Bulbine cepacea is a flowering plant in the genus Bulbine, endemic to the Western Cape province, South Africa.

Distribution
Bulbine cepacea occurs in semi-dry Renosterveld vegetation, as far north as Clanwilliam, south to the Cape Peninsula, and as far east as Riversdale.

Description
This species has a spiral rosette of erect, soft, slender (max.1 cm), succulent, green, linear leaves with acute tips. The leaves are almost rounded (terete) in cross section, having a flat upper surface and a rounder lower surface. 

The leaf base is striated, and has a sheath that encloses the stem. 
 
It has a short stem above its large, flattened, disc-shaped subterranean tuber. 

This species flowers in autumn.

References

cepacea
Renosterveld
Taxa named by Nicolaas Laurens Burman